Arroyo Seco Bridge may refer to the following bridges over the Arroyo Seco in California, USA:
The Washington Boulevard Bridge
The Seco Street Bridge
The Colorado Street Bridge (Pasadena, California), a concrete arch road bridge built in Pasadena in 1913 to carry Colorado Boulevard over the Arroyo
The Arroyo Seco Bridge (State Route 134), another concrete arch road bridge built immediately north of the Colorado Street Bridge in the 1950s to carry State Route 134 over the Arroyo
The La Loma Bridge which carries La Loma Road over the Arroyo
 The Santa Fe Arroyo Seco Railroad Bridge
The California State Route 110 Bridge
The York Boulevard Bridge which on the east end becomes Pasadena Avenue; built in 1912
The Interstate 5 Bridge
The San Fernando Road Bridge
The Avenue 19 Bridge, the last bridge before the Arroyo Seco flows into the Los Angeles River